George Sebastian popularly known as S. George is an Indian makeup artist, film producer who works in Malayalam film industry. He is the son of M. O Devasia and has won Kerala State Awate Award for the Best Makeup Man in 2010 for the movie Paleri Manikyam: Oru Pathirakolapathakathinte Katha. He is noted for his recurring collaboration with Mammootty, associating with him in more than 25 films and later becoming his personal makeup man.

Early life and family 
Hailing from Alleppey, George was born to M.O Devasia, who was one of the leading makeup artists of Malayalam Cinema. He had his schooling in Chennai and later joined Malayalam cinema as an assistant to his father. George is married to Usha George. The couple has two daughters named Cynthia George and Cylvia George.

Career 
George began his career as an assistant makeup artist to his father M.O Devasia through the 1991 film Neelagiri which was directed by I V Sasi. This also marked his long-time association with the veteran actor Mammooty. George collaborated with Mammooty in more than 25 major films and later went on to become Mammootty's personal makeup man. He is debut as an independent makeup artist happened through the movie Kauravar which was directed by Joshiy

In 2010, he shared the best makeup man award in the 40th Kerala State Film Awards along with Ratheesh Ambady for the movie Paleri Manikyam: Oru Pathirakolapathakathinte Katha. In 2006, he won the critics award for best make up for the movie Karutha Pakshikal

In 2013, George entered into film production by producing the movie Immanuel which was directed by Lal Jose and had Mammootty and Fahad Fasil on the lead. The movie turned out to be one of the highest grosser of 2013. Following which he produced movies like Achaa Din & Puzhu.

Awards
 2006 - Critics Award for Best Makeup for Karutha Pakshikal
 2010 - 40th Kerala State Award Critics Award for Best Makeup for Paleri Manikyam: Oru Pathirakolapathakathinte Katha

Filmography

As Producer

As Make Up Artist

References

External links 
 

Malayali people
Malayalam film producers
Film producers from Kerala
Businesspeople from Kerala
21st-century Indian businesspeople
1972 births
Living people